The North Simcoe Railtrail is a recreational trail located in the Township of Springwater, Simcoe County, Ontario, Canada.

The trail follows the route of the former North Simcoe Railway, built in 1878, and  abandoned in 1991 by CN.  All structures were removed upon closure of the line, although a replica station has since been erected.

The North Simcoe Railtrail is part of the Trans Canada Trail and the city council of Barrie is working to connect it together, as the Railtrail ends two streets from the beginning of the Trail.

See also
 List of rail trails in Canada

References

External links
North Simcoe Railtrail
North Simcoe Railtrail
North Simcoe Railtrail

Hiking trails in Ontario
Rail trails in Ontario
Transport in Simcoe County